Marion Mitterhammer (born 8 August 1965) is an Austrian actress.

Biography
Marion Mitterhammer was born in Bruck an der Mur in 1965. Mitterhammer studied acting at the University of Music and Performing Arts Graz.  Her first roles were at Theater Baden-Baden and at the Salzburg Festival where she worked with Jürgen Flimm and Thomas Langhoff. In 1990 Mitterhammer toured with a production of Anton Chekhov. Mitterhammer then worked for two years in Vienna. She started working on television in 1992 and was awarded Young actress of the Year by the Austrian film jury for 1994. She was awarded the 2017 Austrian Film Award for Best Female Supporting Role.

Personal life
Mitterhammer is married to the German film director and cameraman Hans-Günther Bücking. Mitterhammer shared that she has Alopecia areata, first noticed when she was 16. Since then her hair came and went until 1990 when her hair finally failed entirely.

Sources

1965 births
Living people
People from Bruck an der Mur
University of Music and Performing Arts Graz alumni
20th-century Austrian actresses
21st-century Austrian actresses
Austrian film actresses
Austrian stage actresses
Austrian television actresses